Thyrgis angustifascia is a moth in the subfamily Arctiinae. It was described by Hering in 1925. It is found in Bolivia.

References

Moths described in 1925
Arctiinae